

General information
This table gives basic general information about the different editors:

Active

Discontinued / Inactive

Definition
 professional: used for full length Hollywood movies;
 professional (small): mainly used for paid commercials, short films or podcasts/YouTube channels;
 prosumer: Mainly targeting private use, anything that can do more than just trimming a film;
 basic: trimming a film;

System requirements 
This table lists the operating systems that different editors can run on without emulation, as well as other system requirements. Note that minimum system requirements are listed; some features (like High Definition support) may be unavailable with these specifications.

"Unix" includes the similar Linux, BSD and Unix-like operating systems.

High definition/High resolution import
The table below indicates the ability of each program to import various High Definition video or High resolution video formats for editing.

Feature set

Output options
Please note that recording to Blu-ray does not imply 1080@50p/60p . Most only support up to 1080i 25/30 frames per second recording.  Also not all formats can be output.

See also
 List of video editing software
 Comparison of video converters
 Photo slideshow software
 Non-linear editing system
 Comparison of DVD ripper software

References

Comparison of video editing software
Video editing software